St. Brieux is a town in the Canadian province of Saskatchewan. It is located near Highway 368 and Highway 779. St. Brieux is located to the north of Lake Lenore.

Founded in 1904, the St. Brieux district was settled by immigrants from Brittany, France; the name of St. Brieux was chosen in memory of Saint-Brieuc, France, where many of the settlers originated. Families continued to arrive from France until World War I broke out in 1914. From 1908-1920, American settlers, many of whom were descendants of French Canadians who had earlier immigrated to the United States, came to St. Brieux. From 1911-1923, people of Hungarian and Italian descent moved into the area, along with English speaking settlers, mainly from Ontario.

The St. Brieux Museum (c. 1919) is designated a Municipal Heritage Property under Saskatchewan's Heritage Property Act.

St-Brieux Catholic Church features stained glass windows by Rault Frères (Brittany) Franc, as well as Hailey Dmytrow. 

The largest employer is Bourgault Industries Ltd. Bourgault Industries Ltd. also operates the St. Brieux Airport.

St. Brieux is one of the few French speaking communities in Saskatchewan.

Demographics 

See also 

 List of communities in Saskatchewan
 List of towns in Saskatchewan

References

External links

Lake Lenore No. 399, Saskatchewan
Towns in Saskatchewan
Division No. 15, Saskatchewan